Doura may be:
 Tura language
 Toura language (Papua New Guinea)